Melody is the debut solo album by Sharleen Spiteri, lead singer of the Scottish band Texas. It was released on 14 July 2008 and peaked at number three in the UK Albums Chart.

Singles
The first single taken from her debut album was "All The Times I Cried," and debuted on the UK Singles Chart at number 47, before rising to 26 with the physical release. Its full chart run was 47-26-27-32-33-37-47-out. Melody debuted at number 3 in the UK Albums Chart, and its chart run in the first five weeks was 3-5-7-5-8. The album has so far been certified Gold in the UK for sales of over 100,000 copies. The second single off the album "Stop, I Don't Love You Anymore" - released on 6 October 2008 - did not have as much chart success as the first single or the album; it peaked outside the top 100 at 107. The third single of the album was "It Was You," released on 1 December 2008.

"Don't Keep Me Waiting" was only released in Switzerland and charted at number 78.

The song was chosen for use in the soundtrack of the final run of The L Word, an American television series.

Critical reception

Track listing

"Melody" contains a sample from the recording "Jane B" performed by Jane Birkin and Serge Gainsbourg (taken from the album Jane Birkin/Serge Gainsbourg) written by Serge Gainsbourg.
A non-CD track called "That Was a Lie" was recorded and made available for early download from Spiteri's website but did not make the final track listing.

Personnel
Sharleen Spiteri - vocals, guitar, piano, percussion, backing vocals
Johnny McElhone - bass
Michael Bannister - drums, keyboards, piano, programming
Ross Hamilton - bass, guitar, piano, backing vocals
Tom MacNiven - trumpet
Bogus Kostecki, Chris Tombling, David Woodcock, Emlyn Singleton, Everton Nelson, Jonathan Rees, Julian Leaper, Patrick Kiernan, Peter Hanson, Steve Morris, Tom Pigott-Smith, Warren Zielinski - violin
Bruce White, Katie Wilkinson, Peter Lale - viola
Anthony Pleeth, Caroline Dale, Ian Burdge - cello
Paul Leonard Morgan - string arrangements
with:
Bernard Butler - guitar, piano
Makoto Sakamoto - drums, percussion
David McAlmont - harmony vocals
Leon Michels - saxophone, piano
Allon Beauvoisin - baritone saxophone
Jim Hunt - saxophone
Dominic Glover, Michael Leonhart - trumpet
Nichol Thomson - trombone
Sally Herbert - string arrangement, violin
Louisa Fuller - violin
Technical
Aboud Creative - art direction, design
Julian Broad - photography

Charts

Weekly charts

Year-end charts

Certifications
 BPI (United Kingdom) - Gold [Awarded on 8 August 2008]

References

2008 debut albums
Sharleen Spiteri albums
Mercury Records albums
Albums produced by Bernard Butler